USC Tower, formerly AT&T Center, SBC Tower, Transamerica Building, and Occidental Life Building, is a 32-story,  skyscraper in the South Park neighborhood of Los Angeles, California, United States. Built to house the offices and computer center of the Occidental Life Insurance Company, it was completed in 1965. It is the 32nd-tallest building in Los Angeles, and was the second-tallest (after the Los Angeles City Hall) when it was completed. The International styled building was designed by William Pereira & Associates. In 2011 the exterior of the building was used in the music video for Avicii's Levels with at the top of the building saying having a sign saying Levels/Le7vels.inc on it instead of USC

History
The building is part of a  complex built as Occidental Center, and now known as South Park Center. In the 1960s, 70s and 80s there was a restaurant at the top of the building—The Tower—that served award-winning French cuisine. It originally included two other large buildings - a  building at 1149 Hill Street, a  building at 514 W 12th Street (which was later sold to the city as the Public Works Building). It also included three parking decks with 3,500 spots, and a  plot on the corner of Eleventh and Olive Streets. The three buildings are connected by underground pedestrian tunnels.  

Canyon-Johnson Realty Advisors bought the 3-building complex and various parking lots and structures in April 2003 for $88 million. After closing, one building was sold to the California State Bar Association who had occupied that building as a tenant. Another building was sold to the LAPD as a temporary HQ while the Parker Center renovation was completed. The tower was leased to SBC in 2004. Canyon-Johnson sold numerous surface parking lots to developers and the fully-leased tower to LBA Realty in 2005. In 2007 to 2008 it went under a $35 million renovation. Scaffolding was put around the building's crown, the metallic panels were replaced, and the office space was upgraded.  It has since been rebranded as South Park Center along with the renaming of the 32-story tower as USC Tower in 2015.

See also
List of tallest buildings in Los Angeles

References

External links 
 South Park Center official website

Sources
Angelenic
Angelenic
bnet

Skyscraper office buildings in Los Angeles
Buildings and structures in Downtown Los Angeles
1965 establishments in California
1960s architecture in the United States
Center (Los Angeles)
William Pereira buildings
Office buildings completed in 1965